One Spring Night is a 2019 South Korean television series starring Jung Hae-in, Han Ji-min and Kim Jun-han. It aired from May 22 to July 11, 2019, and is the first weekday miniseries to be aired by MBC on an earlier timeslot of Wednesdays and Thursdays at 20:55 KST.

Synopsis
Lee Jeong-in (Han Ji-Min) is a librarian who has been in relationship with a banker, Kwon Gi-seok (Kim Jun-han) for 4 years. Yoo Ji-ho (Jung Hae-in) is a pharmacist, and a single dad. He has graduated a year later than Kwon Gi-seok from the same university. Little do they realize after meeting each other, Ji-ho and Jeong-in will begin to see love and relationships in a whole new light.

Jeong-in meets Ji-ho at the Woori Pharmacy when she goes to buy remedies for her hangover. She tells him she is in a rush, but then realizes she has forgotten her wallet because she left it at her friend's place, where she stayed the previous night. He gives her the remedies and tells her she can pay him back later, and he also gives her money for a taxi to go home.

Ji-ho immediately becomes interested in Jeong-in after their first meeting, and  does not respond to her texts intentionally so she has to pay him back in person instead of paying him back EFT. When she finally revisits the pharmacy, he implies his interest in her to which she responds she can only be friends with him. She tells Ji-ho she is in a relationship. Ji-ho hesitantly admits he is a single parent with a son from a previous relationship. (Single parenthood in South Korea is still frowned upon even though some attitudes about the subject are changing to be more positive.) As a young single parent, Ji-ho has to face this social stigma from almost everyone throughout the episodes. Strangers, Jeong-in's parents, and his friends look down on him due to his parental state. Jeong-in is the only person who doesn't seem to mind.

Parents of Jeong-in and Gi-seok have been pressuring them to get married, but Jeong-in doesn't feel like she is ready since she's unsure if she loves Gi-seok. After meeting Ji-ho, Jeong-in starts having doubts about marrying Gi-seok.

Ji-ho and Jeong-in realize how difficult it would be to have a relationship with each other, so they intend to leave it be. However, tension builds between the two as Ji-ho cannot deny his feelings for Jeong-in and Jeong-in struggles to suppress her feelings for Ji-ho. There are many times where she calls him and wants to meet with him for no apparent reason. After some time, she decides to follow her heart. Both Ji-ho and Jeong-in have to make uncomfortable decisions, and the road for them is never easy as they prove to their parents and friends the sincerity of their feelings.

As a subplot running throughout is the relationship of Jeong-in's sister with her husband, who is abusive and violent, and, though they are effectively separated, will not let her divorce him and threatens her when she brings it up. This marriage was arranged by the parents.

Cast

Main
 Han Ji-min as Lee Jeong-in, a librarian.
 Jung Hae-in as Yoo Ji-ho, a pharmacist.
 Kim Jun-han as Kwon Gi-seok, a banker.

Supporting

People around Lee Jeong-in
 Im Sung-eon as Lee Seo-in, Jeong-in's eldest sister who is a broadcasting announcer.
 Joo Min-kyung as Lee Jae-in, Jeong-in's youngest sister who is a university student.
 Song Seung-hwan as Lee Tae-hak, Jeong-in's father who is the principal of Soo Young High School.
 Gil Hae-yeon as Shin Hyung-seon, Jeong-in's mother who is a housewife.
 Lee Sang-hee as Song Yeong-joo, Jeong-in's colleague at the library and friend.
 Yoon Seul as Oh Ha-rin, Jeong-in's colleague at the library.
 Lee Moo-saeng as Nam Si-hoon, Seo-in's husband who is a dentist.

People around Yoo Ji-ho
 Oh Man-suk as Yoo Nam-soo, Ji-ho's father who is the co-owner of a laundrette.
 Kim Jung-young as Go Sook-hee, Ji-ho's mother who is the co-owner of a laundrette.
 Ha Yi-an as Yoo Eun-u, Ji-ho's son.
 Seo Jeong-yeon as Wang Hye-jung, Ji-ho's colleague and friend.
 Lee Yoo-jin as Lee Ye-seul, Ji-ho's colleague and a part-time student.
 Lim Hyun-soo as Choi Hyun-soo, Ji-ho's friend who is a bank clerk.
 Lee Chang-hoon as Park Yeong-jae, Ji-ho's best friend who is a student.

People around Kwon Gi-seok
 Kim Chang-wan as Kwon Young-kook, Gi-seok's father.
 Lee Ji-hyun as Lawyer.

Production
 The lead female role was first offered to Son Ye-jin, who starred alongside Jung Hae-in in the 2018 hit television series Something in the Rain, but she declined.
 It is the second collaboration between actor Jung Hae-in, writer Kim Eun and director Ahn Pan-seok.

Original soundtrack

Viewership

Notes

References

External links
  
 
 
 

MBC TV television dramas
2019 South Korean television series debuts
2019 South Korean television series endings
South Korean romance television series
Television series by JS Pictures
Korean-language Netflix exclusive international distribution programming